Isabelle Jonckheere  is a Belgian amateur snooker player. She was runner-up to Wendy Jans at the 2006 EBSA European Snooker Championship for women.

She has won the Belgian national women's snooker title three times, in 2005, 2006 and 2011.

Career Highlights

European Championship (Women)

Team competitions

BBSA Belgian National Championship (Women's)

References

Living people
Belgian snooker players
Female snooker players
Year of birth missing (living people)